Callona is a genus of beetles in the family Cerambycidae, containing the following species:

 Callona basilea (Bates, 1880)
 Callona championi (Bates, 1885)
 Callona flavofasciata Chemsak & Hovore, in Eya & Tyson, 2011
 Callona iridescens (White, 1853)
 Callona lampros (Bates, 1885)
 Callona praestans (Casey, 1912)
 Callona rimosa (Buquet, 1840)
 Callona rutilans (Bates, 1869)
 Callona thoracica (White, 1853)
 Callona tricolor G. R. Waterhouse, 1840

References

 
Cerambycidae genera